Thovarimala Ezhuthupara is a remotely located rock shelter in the Wayanad district of Kerala in India. Pre-historic stone age petroglyphs dating from around 1000 BC and after had been discovered here at a height of 500 m on Thovarimala. One can see the stone age rock engravings on the walls of these natural caves from top of Thovarimala. The rare historic treasure at Thovarimala throwing light into human habitation in the Wayanad area since ancient times, is yet to receive the protection of agencies like Archaeology Department, which preserves the Edakkal Caves just five kilometers away. The carvings, found on the upper side of the cave, depict few geometrical figures, an arrow, and one carving closely resembles a female genital organ. Recently more writings were located in this cave. The name Ezhuthupara means "writings on the stone."

Transportation
This village can be accessed from Sultan Battery. The Periya ghat road connects Mananthavady to Kannur and Thalassery. The Thamarassery mountain road connects Calicut with Kalpetta. The Kuttiady mountain road connects Vatakara with Kalpetta and Mananthavady. The Palchuram mountain road connects Kannur and Iritty with Mananthavady. The road from Nilambur to Ooty is also connected to Wayanad through the village of Meppadi.

The nearest railway station is at Mysore and the nearest airports are Kozhikode International Airport-120 km, Bengaluru International Airport-290 km, and Kannur International Airport, 58 km.

 

Caves of Kerala
Rock art in India
History of Kerala
Archaeological sites in Kerala
Rock shelters